Josef Vogel (born 14 December 1952) is an Austrian cross-country skier. He competed in the men's 15 kilometre event at the 1976 Winter Olympics.

References

External links
 

1952 births
Living people
Austrian male cross-country skiers
Olympic cross-country skiers of Austria
Cross-country skiers at the 1976 Winter Olympics
People from Knittelfeld
Sportspeople from Styria
20th-century Austrian people